Todd Darren Lieberman (born February 20, 1973) is an American film and television producer.  He founded Hidden Pictures Media  in 2022 and won an Emmy for Chip 'n Dale: Rescue Rangers in 2022.  He co-founded Mandeville Films and Television with David Hoberman in 2002. Mandeville has produced several notable films, including The Fighter, which won two Academy Awards in 2010, and for which Lieberman was nominated for the Oscar for Best Picture.

Early life
Todd was born to a Jewish family in Cleveland, and grew up in Lyndhurst and Pepper Pike, Ohio. He graduated from Hawken School. and the University of Pennsylvania. There he was a member of the Mask and Wig Club. He performed with local theatre groups in Ohio before college where he continued to perform, then moving to Los Angeles in 1995. He began there with acting and then moved on to writing, reviewing film scripts, then on to directing and producing. He earned a Bachelor of Arts degree from the University of Pennsylvania in 1995 where he was a member of the Alpha Epsilon Pi fraternity and The Mask and Wig Club.

Career
Lieberman was Senior Vice President for International Finance at the production company Hyde Park Entertainment, which produced and co-financed films such as Anti-Trust, Bandits and Moonlight Mile. Lieberman established himself at the international sales and distribution company Summit Entertainment, where he progressed thanks to championing the independent film Memento and acquiring the rights to American Pie.

In 1999, Lieberman was hired by David Hoberman to work for Mandeville Films. After a short hiatus, the two re-formed the production company as Mandeville Films and Television in 2002, with both serving as co-owners and company partners. In 2001, he was named one of the "35 under 35" people to watch in the business by The Hollywood Reporter and was named by the same The Hollywood Reporter as 30 of the most powerful producers in the business in 2015.

His films have accrued several accolades over the years, including a People’s Choice Award for “The Proposal”, "AFI Awards Movie of the Year Award"  and "Academy Award for "The Fighter", PGA Award for "Wonder", Hollywood Film Award for "Stronger (2017)", and an Emmy for "Chip 'n Dale: Rescue Rangers"

In 2018 Lieberman was awarded the key to the state of Ohio. 

In 2022, Todd Lieberman launched his new production company, Hidden Pictures.

Personal life
Lieberman is married to former film producer Heather Lieberman (née Zeegen). Together, the couple have 2 sons Jasper and Isadore. He is a member of the Academy of Motion Picture Arts and Sciences, the Academy of Television Arts & Sciences, and is a mentor at the Producers Guild of America.

Lieberman serves on the Creative Council of Represent.Us, a nonpartisan anti-corruption organization 
 and serves as a judge on the Hamptons International Film Festival.

He is not related to Joe Lieberman.

In 2022, the University of Pennsylvania honored Lieberman with Penn's Creative Spirit Award.

Filmography
He was a producer in all films unless otherwise noted.

Film

Television

Awards and nominations

References

External links

Mandeville Films website

1973 births
Living people
Film producers from California
Television producers from California
People from Los Angeles
Businesspeople from Cleveland
University of Pennsylvania alumni
20th-century American Jews
Film producers from Ohio
21st-century American Jews
Primetime Emmy Award winners